Mathias Engebretsen (born 24 January 1993) is a Norwegian footballer who is playing as a defensive midfielder for Kvik Halden FK.

Hailing from Sponvika, he started his career in Berg IL, and went on to sign for larger clubs in the district, along with Simen Standerholden and Ole Strømsborg. Engebretsen started his senior career in Sarpsborg 08 FF. The team alternated between the first and second tier, but Engebretsen appeared in the Norwegian Premier League four times in 2011 and once in 2013.

Engebretsen was also loaned out to Moss FK in 2013. Ahead of the 2014 season he joined Kvik Halden FK.

References

External links

1993 births
Living people
People from Halden
Norwegian footballers
Sarpsborg 08 FF players
Eliteserien players
Norwegian First Division players
Moss FK players
Association football midfielders
Sportspeople from Viken (county)